Cadillac Cafe is a restaurant in Portland, Oregon's Irvington neighborhood, in the United States.

Description
Cadillac Cafe is a restaurant along Northeast Broadway in Portland's Irvington neighborhood. A fully functional pink 1961 Cadillac and other vintage car memorabilia are displayed inside. In 2008, Willamette Week said, "With its many tropical plants and a 1962 pink convertible on display, the Cadillac feels like a road trip to Miami, circa 1965."

History
Ownership of the restaurant changed to James Hall and Josh Johnston in 2015. In 2020, Cadillac was forced to close temporarily during the COVID-19 pandemic, but had reopened with expanded outdoor seating by July.

Reception
Morgan Troper of the Portland Mercury called Cadillac an "institution" of the city's Lloyd District.

References

External links

 
 Cadillac Cafe at Zomato

Irvington, Portland, Oregon
Restaurants in Portland, Oregon
Year of establishment missing